Myriam Carolina Arévalos Villalba (born April 5, 1993) is a Paraguayan model and beauty pageant titleholder who after being crowned Miss Mundo Paraguay at the Nuestra Belleza Paraguay 2014 pageant represented her country at the Miss World 2014 pageant held in London. She also represented Paraguay at Miss Universe 2015 held in Las Vegas.

Personal life
Myriam is a model in Paraguay. She has a degree in International Relations, and works with NGOs such as TECHO. Prior to Miss Paraguay, she won pageants such as Reina de Turismo Paraguay 2012, which gave her the opportunity to represent Paraguay at the Miss Turismo Universo 2014 pageant held in Ecuador, where she won the title of Miss Tourism Universe 2014.

Nuestra Belleza Paraguay 2014
At Nuestra Belleza Paraguay 2014, Myriam placed as second runner-up and was automatically declared Miss World Paraguay 2014 (Miss Mundo Paraguay 2014) and represented Paraguay at Miss World 2014 held in London, England but unplaced.

Miss United Continents 2015
She represented her country at the 2015 Miss United Continents pageant. She ended up as the first runner-up.

Nuestra Belleza Paraguay 2015
Arévalos won Miss Tierra Paraguay 2015 (Miss Earth Paraguay) in the Nuestra Belleza Paraguay 2015 pageant and was to represent Paraguay in the Miss Earth 2015 contest. In early November, the first-place winner of Nuestra Belleza Paraguay 2015, Laura Garcete, was dethroned as the winner as a result of her pregnancy. Myriam was appointed by the Nuestra Belleza Paraguay Organization to compete at the Miss Universe 2015 pageant held in Las Vegas on December 20, 2015. She did not place at the competition.

References

External links
www.bellezaparaguaya.org

]

Miss Universe 2015 contestants
Paraguayan female models
1993 births
Paraguayan beauty pageant winners
Miss World 2014 delegates
People from Asunción
Living people